Members of the New South Wales Legislative Assembly who served in the 13th parliament of New South Wales held their seats from 1887 to 1889. They were elected at the 1887 colonial election between 4 and 26 February 1887. The Speaker was James Young. This was the first parliament to have recognizable party groups.

By-elections

Under the constitution, ministers were required to resign to recontest their seats in a by-election when appointed. These by-elections are only noted when the minister was defeated; in general, he was elected unopposed.

See also
Fourth Parkes ministry
Second Dibbs ministry
Results of the 1887 New South Wales colonial election
Candidates of the 1887 New South Wales colonial election

References

Members of New South Wales parliaments by term
19th-century Australian politicians